The Alfa Romeo P3, P3 monoposto or Tipo B was a classic Grand Prix car designed by Vittorio Jano, one of the Alfa Romeo 8C models. The P3 was first genuine single-seat Grand Prix racing car and Alfa Romeo's second monoposto after Tipo A monoposto (1931). It was based on the earlier successful Alfa Romeo P2. Taking lessons learned from that car, Jano went back to the drawing board to design a car that could last longer race distances.

Description
The P3 was the first genuine single seater racing car, and was powered by a supercharged eight-cylinder engine. The car was very light for the period, weighing just over 1,500 lb (680 kg) despite using a cast iron engine block.

The P3 was introduced in June, halfway through the 1932 Grand Prix season in Europe, winning its first race at the hands of Tazio Nuvolari, and going on to win 6 races that year driven by both Nuvolari and Rudolf Caracciola, including all 3 major Grands Prix in Italy, France and Germany.

The 1933 Grand Prix season brought financial difficulties to Alfa Corse so the cars were simply locked away and Alfa attempted to rest on their laurels.  Enzo Ferrari had to run his breakaway 'works' Alfa team as Scuderia Ferrari, using the older, less effective Alfa Monzas. Alfa procrastinated until August and missed the first 25 events, and only after much wrangling was the P3 finally handed over to Scuderia Ferrari.  P3s then won six of the final 11 events of the season including the final 2 major Grands Prix in Italy and Spain.

The regulations for the 1934 Grand Prix season brought larger bodywork requirements, so to counteract this the engine was bored out to 2.9 litres. Louis Chiron won the French Grand Prix at Montlhery, whilst the German Silver Arrows dominated the other four rounds of the European Championship.  However the P3s won 18 of all the 35 Grands Prix held throughout Europe.

By the 1935 Grand Prix season the P3 was hopelessly uncompetitive against the superior German cars in 6 rounds of the European Championship, but that didn't stop one final, legendary works victory. The P3 was bored out to 3.2 litres for Nuvolari for the 1935 German Grand Prix at the Nürburgring, in the heartland of the Mercedes and Auto-Union empire. In the race, Nuvolari punctured a tyre early on while leading, but after the pitstop he carved through the field until the last lap when Manfred von Brauchitsch, driving the more powerful Mercedes Benz W25 suffered a puncture, leaving Nuvolari to win the race in front of 300,000 stunned Germans.

The P3's agility and versatility enabled it to win 16 of the 39 Grands Prix in 1935. The P3 had earned its place as a truly great racing car.

Drivers
 1932: Tazio Nuvolari, Rudolf Caracciola, Giuseppe Campari, Baconin Borzacchini
 1933: Louis Chiron, Luigi Fagioli, Giuseppe Campari
 1934: Achille Varzi, Louis Chiron, Guy Moll, Brian E. Lewis, Carlo Felice Trossi, Gianfranco Comotti
 1935: Tazio Nuvolari, Raymond Sommer, Louis Chiron, Comte George de Montbressieux, Richard Shuttleworth, René Dreyfus, Vittorio Belmondo, Mario Tadini, Antonio Brivio, Guido Barbieri, Pietro Ghersi, Renato Balestrero
 1936: Raymond Sommer, "Charlie" Martin, José Padierna de Villapadierna, Giovanni Battaglia, Clemente Biondetti, Austin Dobson

Notes

References
Profile of P3 at Grand Prix History
The Golden Age by Leif Snellman

External links
 Results Tables by Quintin Cloud

Grand Prix cars
P3 1932-35 Grand Prix racer
Cars introduced in 1932
1930s cars

de:Alfa Romeo P1/P2/P3